Among the Sheep is a 2016 comic book ongoing series, written by Olexander Koreshkov. The first issue was published in 2016.

According to the Gazeta.ua, the comic book Among the Sheep is among the top 10 most popular Ukrainian comics.

Synopsis
What is the "fear of being human"? What does it mean to "see injustice and remain silent"? When do we turn into our executioners?You avoid such difficult questions to the last. So maybe it would be better to disperse them on the example of one dog living in a world of total fear, lies and greed? Lives like a sheep among sheep...

Editions

References

External links
 Серед овець  (in Ukrainian)
  (in Ukrainian)

Ukrainian comics
2016 books